Iron tetracarbonyl dihydride is the organometallic compound with the formula H2Fe(CO)4. This compound was the first transition metal hydride discovered.  The complex is stable at low temperatures but decomposes rapidly at temperatures above –20 °C.

Preparation 
Iron tetracarbonyl dihydride was first produced by Hieber and Leutert from iron pentacarbonyl, which is first converted to HFe(CO):
Fe(CO)5 + 2 OH− → HFe(CO) + HCO
HFe(CO) + H+ → H2Fe(CO)4
Since the compound is thermally labile and sensitive to light, ideal conditions in 1930's Munich called for winter nights.  The early method was called the "polar night synthesis."

As recommended by Hieber and Leutert, the compound can be purified by trap-to-trap distillation.

Structure and properties 
In iron tetracarbonyl hydride the Fe(CO)4 group has C2v molecular symmetry with a geometry intermediate between octahedral and tetrahedral.  Viewed as an octahedral complex, the hydride ligands are cis. Viewed as a tetrahedral Fe(CO)4 complex, the hydrides occupy adjacent faces of the tetrahedron. Although the structure of tetracarbonyliron with the hydrogen atoms bound as a single H2 ligand has been proposed as an intermediate in some rearrangement reactions, the stable state for the compound has the two atoms as independent ligands.

Reactions 
Iron tetracarbonyl dihydride undergoes rapid ligand substitutions by phosphorus ligands:
H2Fe(CO)4 + PPh3  → H2Fe(CO)3PPh3

The substitution mechanism is proposed to entail transient formation of a 16e− formyl intermediate.

H2Fe(CO)4 has pK1 of 6.8 and pK2 of 15.  The monoanion [HFe(CO)4]− has more extensive reaction chemistry because it is more stable than the dihydride.  The monoanion is an intermediate in the homogeneous iron-carbonyl-catalyzed water-gas shift reaction (WGSR). The slow step in the WGSR is the proton transfer from water to the iron hydride anion.
 
HFe(CO)   +  H2O  →  H2Fe(CO)4  +  OH−

See also
 Potassium tetracarbonyliron hydride
 Collman's reagent

Further reading

References 

Carbonyl complexes
Iron complexes
Metal hydrides